The 1st Kent Artillery Volunteers was a part-time unit of the British Army's Royal Artillery from 1860 to 1956. Primarily serving as coastal artillery defending the Port of Dover and other harbours in South-East England, the unit's successors also served in the heavy artillery role on the Western Front during World War I and as anti-aircraft artillery during the Blitz and later in the North African and Italian campaigns of World War II.

Volunteer Force
Many Volunteer units were raised in Great Britain as a result of an invasion scare in 1859. These small independent units were quickly organised into larger groupings, and the 1st Administrative Brigade of Kent Artillery Volunteers was formed on 15 August 1860. It comprised the following Artillery Volunteer Corps (AVCs):
 1st Kent AVC formed at Gravesend on 20 October 1859; second battery formed 5 March 1860
 2nd Kent AVC formed at Faversham on 15 November 1859 ; second battery formed 27 August 1861
 3rd Kent AVC formed at Folkestone on 7 November 1859 (transferred to the 1st Cinque Ports Artillery Volunteers in April 1860)
 4th Kent AVC formed at Sheerness Dockyard on 9 January 1860 (absorbed by the 13th Kent AVC 23 January 1867)
 5th Kent AVC formed at Blackheath on 28 February 1860, augmented by a half battery 25 March 1862; to two full batteries after September 1863
 6th Kent AVC appeared in the Army List in March 1860 but was never formed
 7th Kent AVC formed at Greenwich in March 1860 but no officers were ever gazetted and it was removed from the Army List in 1862
 8th Kent AVC was never formed
 9th Kent AVC formed at Plumstead as a sub-division 13 February, increased to a battery 15 August 1860; attached to the 10th Kent AVC June 1870. Renumbered 2nd in 1880.
 10th Kent AVC formed at the Royal Arsenal, Woolwich on 28 February 1860. Renumbered in 1880 as 3rd Kent (Royal Arsenal)
 11th Kent AVC formed at Sandgate as a sub-division 25 February; increased to a battery 2 March 1860
 12th Kent AVC formed at Gillingham on 6 March 1860
 13th Kent AVC formed at Sheerness Dockyard on 1 March 1860 as two batteries; took over 4th Kent AVC as third battery 23 January 1867
 14th Kent AVC formed at Woolwich Dockyard on 29 March 1860; disbanded in 1870 when the dockyard closed

Reorganisation
A reorganisation in May 1880 saw the Plumstead and Woolwich units become independent, and the remaining Corps were consolidated as the 1st Kent Artillery Volunteer Corps (1st KAVC) with HQ at Gravesend and eleven batteries provided as follows:
 Nos 1 and 2 Batteries at Gravesend from 1st Kent AVC
 Nos 3 and 4 Batteries at Faversham from 2nd Kent AVC
 Nos 5 and 6 Batteries at Blackheath from 5th Kent AVC
 No 7 Battery at Sandgate from 11th Kent AVC
 No 8 Battery at Gillingham from 12th Kent AVC
 Nos 9–11 Batteries at Sheerness from 13th Kent AVC

All artillery volunteers were attached to one of the territorial divisions of the Royal Artillery (TA) in 1882 with the 1st KAVC joining the Cinque Ports Division. In 1887 the unit was redesignated the 3rd Volunteer (Kent) Brigade, Cinque Ports Division, RA, but this title only lasted until the Cinque Ports Division was disbanded in 1889, when the unit transferred to the Eastern Division and became the 1st Kent Artillery Volunteer Corps (Eastern Division, RA).

By 1892, the Kent Artillery Volunteer Corps were organised as follows:
 1st Kent Artillery Volunteers – Headquarters at Gravesend
 2nd Kent Artillery Volunteers – Headquarters at Plumstead
 3rd Kent Artillery Volunteers (Royal Arsenal) – Headquarters at Woolwich

In 1889, the Artillery Volunteers became part of the Royal Garrison Artillery (RGA), and when the territorial divisions were abolished the 1st KAVC was designated 1st Kent Brigade RGA (Volunteers) from 1 January 1902.

Territorial Force
When the Volunteers were subsumed into the new Territorial Force (TF) under the Haldane Reforms of 1908, the 1st Kent Brigade provided the Home Counties (Kent) Heavy Battery, RGA, including its ammunition column, and three companies of the Kent and Sussex Royal Garrison Artillery. However, this unit was broken up in 1910, the Kent batteries becoming the Kent RGA and the Sussex batteries forming a separate Sussex RGA.

The Home Counties (Kent) Heavy Battery was based at Beaton Street, Faversham, with its ammunition column at Chatham. Equipped with four 4.7-inch guns it formed part of the Home Counties Division of the TF.

The Kent RGA was a 'defended ports' unit organised as follows:
 HQ at Sheerness
 No 1 Company at Fort Clarence, Rochester, Kent
 No 2 Company at Gravesend
 No 3 Company at Dover

Nos 1 and 2 Companies formed part of Eastern Coast Defences at Chatham, while No 3 Company was in South Eastern Coast Defences at Dover.

World War I

Mobilisation
On the outbreak of war on 4 August 1914, the Kent RGA went to its war stations manning the coast artillery and the Heavy Battery mobilised at Faversham. After mobilisation, units of the TF were invited to volunteer for Overseas Service, and on 15 August the War Office issued instructions to separate those men who had signed up for Home Service only, and form these into reserve units. On 31 August, the formation of a reserve or 2nd Line unit was authorised for each 1st Line unit where 60 per cent or more of the men had volunteered for Overseas Service. The titles of these 2nd Line units would be the same as the original, but distinguished by a '2/' prefix. In this way duplicate companies, batteries and divisions were formed, mirroring those TF formations being sent overseas. Thus were formed the 2/1st, 2/2nd and 2/3rd Companies of the Kent RGA and the 1/1st and 2/1st Home Counties (Kent) Heavy Btys.

The Home Counties Division accepted the liability for service in India to release the regular units of the garrison there for active service on the Western Front. However, heavy artillery was not required for India, so when the division departed on 30 October, the 1/1st Bty stayed behind with the 2nd Home Counties Division that was being formed.

1/1st Kent Heavy Battery

The Home Counties Division accepted the liability for service in India to release the regular units of the garrison there for active service on the Western Front. However, heavy artillery was not required for India, so when the division departed on 30 October, the 1/1st Home Counties (Kent) Bty – usually referred to as the 1/1st Kent Bty – stayed behind with the 2nd Home Counties Division that was being formed. It went out to the Western Front on 29 December 1915 and joined Third Army.

The battery supported 56th (1/1st London) Division in the Attack on the Gommecourt Salient on 1 July, the first day of the Battle of the Somme. The Gommecourt attack was a disaster but it had only been a diversion from Fourth Army's main Somme offensive, and Third Army closed it down at the end of the first day. In August the battery transferred to support Fourth Army in the continuing Somme offensive. Lack of ammunition and the worn state of the old 4.7-inch guns reduced its effectiveness.

Over the next two years, the 1/1st Kent Bty was moved from one Heavy Artillery Group (HAG)  to another as circumstances demanded. On 12 February 1917, the battery was joined by a section of 118th Heavy Bty RGA to make it up to a strength of six guns. This was a regular unit formed at Woolwich shortly after the outbreak of war and had been in France with 4.7-inch guns since 6 November 1914. By now, the heavy batteries on the Western Front were adopting the modern 60-pounder in place of the obsolete 4.7-inch.

Fourth Army followed the German retreat to the Hindenburg Line in March 1917, then 1/1st Kent Bty transferred to Fifth Army for the Third Ypres Offensive, which culminated in the mud of the Battle of Passchendaele in October–November 1917. In late 1917 the HAGs became permanent brigades. 1/1st Kent Bty joined 92nd (Mobile) Brigade on 13 January 1918 and remained with it until the end of the war. On 1 February 1918, the HAGs became Brigades once more, and 92nd became 92nd (Mobile) Brigade, RGA, composed of four six-gun batteries of 60-pounders.

During the German Spring Offensive of March 1918, 92nd (M) Bde was sent from GHQ Reserve to reinforce the hard-pressed Third Army. 1/1st Kent Bty was caught up in the 'Great Retreat', saving its guns but losing the rest of its equipment. After refitting, the brigade remained with Third Army until the Armistice with Germany on 11 November 1918, having supported it in the Allies' victorious Hundred Days Offensive, including the battles of Albert, Bapaume, Cambrai and the Selle.

After the Armistice the battery went to the Rhine with the Army of Occupation until it was demobilised in May 1919.

2/1st Kent Heavy Battery
The battery formally separated from 1/1st Bty on 26 December 1914, but it was January 1916 before it received its guns. Even then, vital equipment such as sights were still lacking. 67th (2nd Home Counties) Division had a dual role of training drafts for units serving overseas and at the same time being part of the mobile force responsible for home defence. From November 1915 it formed part of Second Army, Central Force, quartered in Kent with 2/1st Bty at Ightham.

In September 1916, the battery moved to Mundesley in Norfolk, where it joined 4th Provisional Brigade. Provisional brigades were TF home defence formations composed of men who had not signed up for overseas service, but after the Military Service Act 1916 swept away the Home/Foreign service distinction all TF soldiers became liable for overseas service, if medically fit. The Provisional Brigades' role thus expanded to include physical conditioning to render men fit for drafting overseas. The 4th Provisional Brigade became the 224th Mixed Brigade in December 1916 ('mixed' in this context indicating a formation of infantry and artillery with supporting units).

At the time of the Armistice, 2/1st Battery was still at Mundesley as part of 224th Mixed Bde.

Kent Royal Garrison Artillery

The Imperial German Navy only carried out 12 bombardments of British coastal targets during World War I, so most of the extensive coastal defences were never tested. Kent was, however, an exception to the inactivity, and the ports of Margate, Broadstairs, Ramsgate and Dover were bombarded in April 1917 (the Second Battle of the Dover Strait), and Dover was shelled again (the last such bombardment of the war) on 16 February 1918. The batteries at Ramsgate and Dover were engaged on these occasions.

Nos 1 and 2 Companies of the Kent RGA, together with Regular RGA companies, manned the Kent side of the Thames and Medway Defences (No 12 Fire Command at Sheerness and No 13 Fire Command at Grain, while No 3 Company, Kent RGA, along with Nos 40 and 46 Companies, RGA, manned the Dover Defences (No 11 Fire Command). These were developed as the war progressed, until by April 1918 they comprised:

Dover Defences
 Dover Turret: 2 x 6-inch Mk VII guns
 Admiralty Pier Battery: 2 x 12-pounder QF guns
 South Breakwater Battery: 2 x 6-inch Mk VII guns
 Knuckle Battery: 3 x 4-inch QF guns
 Citadel Battery: 2 x 9.2-inch Mk X guns
 Langdon Battery: 3 x 9.2-inch Mk X, 2 x 6-inch Mk VII

Ramsgate Defences
 Harbour Battery: 2 x 12-pounder field guns

Meanwhile, although TF defended ports units never served overseas, those that had volunteered were supplying trained gunners to RGA units that were, and providing cadres to form complete new units for front line service. 62nd and 134th Siege Batteries formed at Sheerness in 1915 and Dover in 1916 are known to have had nuclei of men from the Kent RGA (and Sussex RGA in the case of the 134th). This may also have been the case for some of the numerous other siege batteries formed in the two garrisons during the war.

This process meant a continual drain on the manpower of the defended ports units and in April 1917, the coastal defence companies of the RGA (TF) were reorganised. By this stage of the war, the Dover and Newhaven Defences of Eastern Command consisted of 1/3 and 2/3 Companies of the Kent RGA  and 1/1, 1/2, 2/1 and 2/2 Companies of the Sussex RGA. These six companies were reduced to just two (Nos 1 and 2 Companies, Sussex RGA), given a slightly higher establishment (five officers and 100 other ranks (ORs)), and the 1st and 2nd Line distinction was abolished. Nos 1 and 2 Kent Companies remained at Grain Fort and Grain Battery respectively.

62nd Siege Battery

62nd Siege Battery, RGA, was formed at Sheerness on 21 September 1915 with a nucleus of Territorials drawn from the Kent RGA. Equipped with four 9.2-inch howitzers it was sent out to the Western Front on 9 March 1916. It saw active service on the Western Front at the Somme and on the Ancre, at Bullecourt, Messines and Passchendaele. The battery was overrun and lost its guns during the German Spring Offensive, but was re-equipped and took part in the final Allied Hundred Days Offensive. 62nd Siege Battery was disbanded in 1919.

134th Siege Battery

134th Siege Battery, RGA, was formed at Dover on 3 May 1916 with a nucleus of Territorials drawn from the Kent and Sussex RGA units. The battery was equipped with four modern 6-inch 26 cwt howitzers and was sent to the Macedonian front, arriving at Salonika on 20 August 1916. It served with XII Corps in the Vardar and Struma valleys. In 1917 it fought in the Second Battle of Doiran, but was then moved to the Palestine Front, where it fought with XXI Corps in the Third Battle of Gaza, the capture of Jerusalem and the victorious Battle of Megiddo. 134th Siege Battery was disbanded in 1919.

Interwar

Kent Heavy Brigade
When the TF was reconstituted as the new Territorial Army (TA) in 1920, the Kent RGA was reformed in 1920, becoming the Kent Coast Brigade, RGA in 1921 and the Kent Heavy Brigade in 1924 when the RGA was subsumed into the Royal Artillery:
 HQ at Fort Clarence, Rochester
 166 Hy Bty at Fort Clarence (166 (City of Rochester) Bty from 1925)
 167 Hy Bty at Pelham Road, Gravesend
 168 Hy Bty at Northampton Street, Dover
 169 Hy Bty at High Street, Sheerness
 170 Hy Bty at Willson's Road, Ramsgate

The brigade was assigned to 44th Home Counties Divisional Area.

In 1926 it was decided that the coastal defences of Great Britain should be solely manned by part-time soldiers of the TA. This entailed some reorganisation of units, and the scheme reached its final form in 1932. As a result, the brigade was split up on 1 October 1932. 166 (City of Rochester) Battery became an independent anti-aircraft (AA) battery, later joining 55th (Kent) AA Bde. 167 and 169 Batteries joined the Essex Heavy Brigade to form the Thames and Medway Heavy Brigade, RA, based at Rochester. The rest of the brigade merged with the single-battery Sussex Heavy Brigade to form the Kent and Sussex Heavy Brigade, RA:
 HQ at Lewes, Sussex, later at Liverpool Street, Dover
 159 (Sussex) Bty at Brighton, later at North Street, Lewes
 168 (Kent) Bty at Liverpool Street, Dover
 170 (Kent) Bty at Willson's Road, Ramsgate

205 (Chatham and Faversham) Battery

Meanwhile, the Home Counties (Kent) Heavy Battery was reconstituted as 205 (Chatham and Faversham) Medium Battery at Sittingbourne, later at the Drill Hall, Chatham. It formed part of 13th (Kent) Medium Brigade (formerly 4th Home Counties Brigade, Royal Field Artillery). This unit was soon redesignated 52nd (Kent) Medium Brigade, and in 1935 became 58th (Kent) Anti-Aircraft Brigade. The following year, 205 (Kent) AA Battery was transferred to 55th (Kent) AA Brigade (see above).

Early in 1939, as part of the doubling of the strength of the TA after the Munich Crisis, 205 (Kent) Battery left 55th AA Regiment (as RA brigades were now termed) to join a new 89th (Cinque Ports) AA Regiment, which was forming as a duplicate of 75th (Cinque Ports) AA Regiment. It served with Anti-Aircraft Command at the start of the war, but sailed for Egypt in December 1939. It then served with the Eighth Army in North Africa and Italy until it was placed in suspended animation in September 1944.

166 (City of Rochester) Battery

At the start of World War II, 55th AA Regiment, including 166th (City of Rochester) Bty, was serving in Anti-Aircraft Command in the Heavy AA (HAA) role with 28th (Thames and Medway) Anti-Aircraft Brigade. During The Blitz 28th AA Bde guarded the Thames, Chatham and Dover in 6th AA Division. In 1941, the regiment left AA Command and became part of the War Office Reserve before sailing for the Middle East. It took part in the Allied invasion of Sicily in 1943 and the subsequent Italian Campaign, where in the absence of air attacks it frequently engaged ground targets in a medium artillery role. 55th (Kent) HAA Regiment was placed in suspended animation in 1946.

World War II

Kent and Sussex Heavy Regiment
On the outbreak of World War II, the regiment went to its war stations manning coastal guns under Dover Fire Command. After the Dunkirk evacuation, the coastal defence of South East England became a critical priority. On 14 July, the Kent and Sussex Heavy Regiment was split into three separate coast regiments, each of three batteries.

519th (Kent & Sussex) Coast Rgt
 RHQ at Dover
 A Bty at Langdon, later at Mill Point – redesignated 291 Bty 1 April 1941; transferred to 550th Coast Rgt 15 June 1942 
 B Bty at Eastern Arm – redesignated 292 Bty 1 April 1941; transferred to 534th (Orkney) Coast Rgt by 13 April 1943
 C Bty at South Breakwater – redesignated 293 (6-inch) & 294 (6-pdr) Btys 1 April 1941
 D Bty at Ramsgate – formed 14 December 1940; redesignated 297 Bty 1 April 1941; disbanded by June 1943
 411 Bty at St Margaret's – joined 31 December 1940; transferred to 26th Coast Artillery Group 5 April 1941
 418 Bty at Knuckle, then Dover Western Heights by March 1943 – joined 31 December 1940, regimented 22 October 1941
 217 Bty at Dover Pier Extension – joined from 520th (K&S) Coast Rgt 22 October 1941
 414 Bty at Western Heights, Knuckle by March 1943 – joined from 520th (K&S) Coast Rgt 22 October 1941
 296 Bty at Dover Turret – joined from 520th (K&S) Coast Rgt 22 October 1941; transferred to 563rd Coast Rgt 12 January 1943
 412 Bty at Mill Point – joined from 550th Coast Rgt 15 June 1942
 337 Bty at Deal – joined from 563rd Coast Rgt 12 January 1943
 142 Bty – joined from 534th (Orkney) Coast Rgt by 13 April 1943
 100 Coast Observer Detachment (COD) – joined by October 1942; disbanded by May 1943

The Coast Observer Detachments (CODs) began to appear in February 1941. They were equipped with early warning radar to detect surface ships and low-flying aircraft, and were later placed in direct communication with the coast artillery plotting rooms.

520th (Kent & Sussex) Coast Rgt
 RHQ at Dover
 A Bty at Dover Citadel – redesignated 295 Bty 1 April 1941; transferred to 516th (Thames & Medway) Coast Rgt 16 April 1943
B Bty at Dover Turret – redesignated 296 Bty 1 April 1941; transferred to 519th (K&S) Coast Rgt 22 October 1941
 C Bty at Dover Pier Extension – redesignated 169 Bty 1 April 1941; transferred to 533rd (Orkney) Coast Rgt 22 May 1941
 414 Bty at Western Heights – joined 31 December 1940; transferred to 519th (K&S) Coast Rgt 22 October 1941
 423 Bty at Lydden Spout Battery – joined from 551st Coast Rgt 4 March 1941
 217 Bty (12-pdr) at Dover Pier Extension – joined from 72nd Coast Artillery Training Rgt 15 May 1941; transferred to 519th (K&S) Coast Rgt 22 October 1941
 424 (Independent) Bty (6-inch) at Capel – joined 21 December 1941
 428 Bty (6-inch) at Hougham Battery – joined from Coast Artillery Training Centre 21 December 1941
 289 Bty at Fletcher – joined from 516th (T&M) Coast Rgt 16 April 1943
 6 COD – joined by June 1941; disbanded by May 1943
 21 COD – joined by June 1941; transferred to 540th Coast Rgt by January 1942
 101 COD – joined by October 1942
 22 COD – joined by November 1943

In the autumn of 1940, 520th Rgt was stationed at Landguard Fort at Harwich, but had returned to Dover Citadel by the end of 1941.

521st (Kent & Sussex) Coast Rgt
 RHQ at Newhaven
 A Bty at Newhaven – redesignated 100 (6-inch) & 101 (12-pdr) Btys 1 April 1941
 100 Bty later at Ringborough; joined 512th (East Riding) Coast Rgt 6 July 1943
 101 Bty disbanded 15 March 1944 and new A Bty formed
 343 Bty at Seaford, later Eastbourne – joined 31 December 1940
 342 Bty at Eastbourne – joined from 552nd Coast Rgt 14 September 1942
 359 Bty at Brighton – joined from 553rd Coast Rgt 14 September 1942
 160 Bty at Newhaven – joined from 566th Coast Rgt 1 May 1943
 193 Bty at Newhaven – joined from 512th (ER) Coast Rgt 6 July 1943
 11, 12 CODs – joined by June 1941
 29 COD – joined by June 1941; transferred to 544th Coast Rgt by January 1942
 5, 13, 15, 109 CODs – joined by December 1942
 14 COD – joined by December 1942; transferred to 532nd (Pembroke) Coast Rgt by January 1943
 3 COD – joined by November 1943; transferred to 516th (T&M) Coast Rgt by March 1944
 10 COD – joined by November 1943

Defence of Dover

Dover was in range of German batteries mounted on the French coast and their first shells fell on Dover on 12 August 1940. Prime Minister Winston Churchill ordered the emplacement of long-range guns and by September two long-range Counter Bombardment (CB) fire commands were being added to the harbour defences, manned by the Royal Artillery and Royal Marines. Eventually, the coast artillery at Dover was developed as follows:

Western CB Fire Command
 Lydden Spout Battery: 3 x 6-inch guns installed May 1941
 Hougham Battery: 3 x 8-inch guns installed September 1942
 Capel: 3 x 8-inch guns installed May 1942

Harbour Fire Command
 Langdon Battery: 2 x 6-inch guns prewar; 1 gun added September 1940
 Dover Turret: 2 x 6-inch prewar
 Breakwater: 2 x 6-inch and 2 x 9.2-inch prewar; 1 twin 6-pounder added May 1940
 Dover Western Heights: 2 x 6-inch installed September 1940
 Eastern Arm: 2 x twin 6-pounder installed September 1939
 Pier Extension: 2 x 12-pounder guns prewar; 1 gun added February 1940
 Knuckle: 2 x 4-inch installed August 1940

Eastern CB Fire Command
 Wanstone Battery: 4 x 5.5-inch guns installed September 1940; 2 x 15-inch guns installed September 1942

Newhaven
 Newhaven Fort had 4 x 6-inch and 2 x 12-pounder guns.

Two further batteries were added later ar Dover:
 Fan Bay Battery: 3 x 6-inch, completed February 1941
 South Foreland Battery: 4 x 9.2-inch, completed October 1941

By May 1942, 519th and 520th Coast Rgts in Kent came under the command of XII Corps Coast Artillery HQ (CAHQ), while 521st Coast Rgt in Sussex came under Canadian Corps CAHQ. By July 1942, CA Plotting Rooms (later termed Army Plotting Rooms) had been created for the most important coast defences, with No 1 at Dover under the Corps Commander, Coast Artillery (CCCA), XII Corps and No 2 at Newhaven under CCCA Canadian Corps. In May 1943, when XII Corps and Canadian Corps were assigned to 21st Army Group for the forthcoming Allied invasion of Normandy (Operation Overlord), their coastal defence role was taken over by East Kent and Sussex Districts respectively under South Eastern Command.

Late war
By 1942 the threat from German attack had diminished, the coast defences were seen as absorbing excessive manpower and there was demand for trained gunners for the fighting fronts. A process of reducing the manpower in the coast defences began. However, the Dover guns remained in commission in order to deny the straits to hostile shipping. The manpower requirements for the Allied invasion of Normandy, Operation Overlord, led to further reductions in coast defences in April 1944. By this stage of the war many of the coast battery positions were manned by Home Guard detachments or were in the hands of care and maintenance parties. On 1 April, 520th and 521st (K&S) Coast Rgt absorbed the batteries of 550th–553rd Coast Rgts, which were being disbanded, giving the three Kent & Sussex regiments the following organisation:

 519th (K&S) Coast Rgt
 217, 292, 293, 294, 337, 412, 414, 418 Btys
 289 Bty – from 520th (K&S) Rgt
 520th (K&S) Coast Rgt
 423, 424, 428 Btys
 194, 335, 340, 415, 416 Btys – from 550th Coast Rgt
 213, 230, 233, 235, 291, 374, 413 Btys – from 551st Coast Rgt
 101 Coast Observer Detachment
 16 Coast Observer Detachment – from 551st Coast Rgt
 521st (K&S) Coast Rgt
 160, 193, 342, 343, 359 Btys
 221, 237, 301, 360, 375 – from 552nd Coast Rgt
 149, 344, 345, 346, 403 – from 553rd Coast Rgt

From now on the regiments were effectively holding units for the remaining cadres of coast units in south east England, and most of the CODs were disbanded. South Eastern Command was abolished at the end of 1944 and the regiments came under Eastern Command.

On 1 June 1945, after VE Day, the three regiments were consolidated (together with 540th and 549th Coast Rgts) into a single regiment, with many batteries disbanded (or placed in 'suspended animation' (S/A) in the case of established TA units):
 519th (K&S) Coast Rgt
 RHQ, 217, 292, 294, 337 Btys
 289, 293 Btys S/A
 412, 414, 418 Btys disbanded
 160 Bty transferred from 521st (K&S) Coast Rgt
 185 Bty transferred from 549th Coast Rgt
 203, 410 Btys transferred from 540th Coast Rgt
 233, 335, 340, 413, 423 Btys transferred from 520th (K&S) Coast Rgt
 6, 101, 102 CODs disbanded by October 1945
 520th (K&S) Coast Rgt
 RHQ & 428 Bty
 291 Bty S/A
 194, 213, 235, 415, 416, 424 Btys disbanded
 521st (K&S) Coast Rgt
 RHQ & 193 Bty S/A
 342, 343, 359 Btys disbanded

519th (K&S) Coast Rgt and all its batteries passed into S/A on 10 January 1946, and 520th (K&S) Coast Rgt and its one remaining battery did likewise in March 1946.

Postwar
On 1 January 1947, when the TA was reconstituted, 520th Regiment was disbanded, while 519th and 521st were reformed as 410th (Kent) Coast Regiment' and 411th (Sussex) Coast Regiment respectively. The Kent unit was organised as follows:Frederick, p. 1011.372–413 Rgts at British Army 1945 on.
 RHQ Dover
 P Bty Dover
 Q Bty at Folkestone
 R Bty at Ramsgate
 S Bty at Dover

410 (Kent) Coast Regiment formed part of 101 Coast BrigadeLitchfield, Appendix 5. in Eastern Command. The coast artillery branch was disbanded in 1956,Maurice-Jones, p. 277. and the regiment was converted to the infantry role, becoming 5th Battalion The Buffs (Royal East Kent Regiment). This battalion later became 7th Bn Queen's Regiment (East Kent).Frederick, p. 345.

Honorary Colonels
The following served as Honorary Colonel of the unit:
 J.B. White, appointed to 1st KAVC 20 October 1887
 J.D. Palmer, appointed to 1st KAVC 5 November 1892
 Sir Horatio G.G. Palmer, appointed to 1st Kent RGA (V) 18 September 1904 and to Kent TGA (TF) 14 June 1911
 Sir Henry Lennard, 2nd Bt, appointed to Kent Coast Bde 5 Apr 1922
 Maj the Hon J.J. Astor, MP, appointed to Kent Heavy Bde 23 November 1927, then joint Hon Col of Kent and Sussex Heavy Bde
 E.L Beves, VD, appointed to Sussex Heavy Bde 6 August 1929, then joint Hon Col of Kent and Sussex Heavy Bde

Footnotes

Notes

References

 Army List, various dates.
 Maj A.F. Becke,History of the Great War: Order of Battle of Divisions, Part 1: The Regular British Divisions, London: HM Stationery Office, 1934/Uckfield: Naval & Military Press, 2007, .
 Maj A.F. Becke,History of the Great War: Order of Battle of Divisions, Part 2a: The Territorial Force Mounted Divisions and the 1st-Line Territorial Force Divisions (42–56), London: HM Stationery Office, 1935/Uckfield: Naval & Military Press, 2007, .
 Maj A.F. Becke,History of the Great War: Order of Battle of Divisions, Part 2b: The 2nd-Line Territorial Force Divisions (57th–69th), with the Home-Service Divisions (71st–73rd) and 74th and 75th Divisions, London: HM Stationery Office, 1937/Uckfield: Naval & Military Press, 2007, .
 Maj A.F. Becke,History of the Great War: Order of Battle of Divisions, Part 4: The Army Council, GHQs, Armies, and Corps 1914–1918, London: HM Stationery Office, 1944/Uckfield: Naval & Military Press, 2007, ISBN 1-847347-43-6.
 Ian F.W. Beckett, Riflemen Form: A Study of the Rifle Volunteer Movement 1859–1908, Aldershot, The Ogilby Trusts: 1982, .
 Burke's Peerage, Baronetage and Knightage, 100th Edn, London, 1953.
 Basil Collier, History of the Second World War, United Kingdom Military Series: The Defence of the United Kingdom, London: HM Stationery Office, 1957/Uckfield: Naval & Military, 2004 ISBN 978-1-84574-055-9.
 Col John K. Dunlop, The Development of the British Army 1899–1914, London: Methuen, 1938.
 Gen Sir Martin Farndale, History of the Royal Regiment of Artillery: Western Front 1914–18, Woolwich: Royal Artillery Institution, 1986, .
 Gen Sir Martin Farndale, History of the Royal Regiment of Artillery: The Forgotten Fronts and the Home Base 1914–18, Woolwich: Royal Artillery Institution, 1988, .
 Gen Sir Martin Farndale, History of the Royal Regiment of Artillery: The Years of Defeat: Europe and North Africa, 1939–1941, Woolwich: Royal Artillery Institution, 1988/London: Brasseys, 1996, .
 J.B.M. Frederick, Lineage Book of British Land Forces 1660–1978, Vol I, Wakefield, Microform Academic, 1984, ISBN 1-85117-007-3.
 J.B.M. Frederick, Lineage Book of British Land Forces 1660–1978, Vol II, Wakefield: Microform Academic, 1984, ISBN 1-85117-009-X.
 Brig E.A. James, British Regiments 1914–18, London: Samson Books, 1978/Uckfield: Naval & Military Press, 2001, ISBN 978-1-84342-197-9.
 
 Norman E.H. Litchfield, The Territorial Artillery 1908–1988 (Their Lineage, Uniforms and Badges), Nottingham: Sherwood Press, 1992, .
 Norman Litchfield & Ray Westlake, The Volunteer Artillery 1859–1908 (Their Lineage, Uniforms and Badges), Nottingham: Sherwood Press, 1982, .
 Alan MacDonald, Pro Patria Mori: The 56th (1st London) Division at Gommecourt, 1st July 1916, 2nd Edn, West Wickham: Iona Books, 2008, .
 Col K. W. Maurice-Jones, The History of Coast Artillery in the British Army, London: Royal Artillery Institution, 1959/Uckfield: Naval & Military Press, 2005, ISBN 978-1-845740-31-3.
 Brig N.W. Routledge, History of the Royal Regiment of Artillery: Anti-Aircraft Artillery 1914–55, London: Royal Artillery Institution/Brassey's, 1994, 
 Edward M. Spiers, The Army and Society 1815–1914, London: Longmans, 1980, .
 Titles and Designations of Formations and Units of the Territorial Army'', London: War Office, 7 November 1927.

External sources
 Mark Conrad, The British Army, 1914 (archive site)
 British Army units from 1945 on
 Dover War Memorial Project
 Kent History Forum
 Kent Fallen: Kent War Memorials Transcription Project
 The Long, Long Trail
 Naval History Net
 Orders of Battle at Patriot Files
 Land Forces of Britain, the Empire and Commonwealth, Regiments.org (archive site)
 The Regimental Warpath 1914–1918 (archive site)
 Royal Artillery 1939–1945
 Graham Watson, The Territorial Army 1947

Kent
Military units and formations in Kent
Gravesend, Kent
Military units and formations in Dover
Military units and formations in Rochester, Kent
Military units and formations established in 1860
Military units and formations disestablished in 1956